The REVAi, known as G-Wiz in the United Kingdom, is a small micro electric car, made by the Indian manufacturer Reva Electric Car Company between 2001 and 2012. By late 2013 Reva had sold about 4,600 vehicles worldwide, in 26 countries. Sales in the United Kingdom, its main market, ended by the end of 2011. Production ended in 2012 and the REVAi was replaced by the Mahindra e2o.

In many countries the REVAi does not meet the criteria to qualify as a highway-capable motor vehicle, and fits into other classes, such as neighborhood electric vehicle (NEV) in the United States and heavy quadricycle in Europe.

The vehicle was originally known as simply the REVA, but was then improved and renamed the REVAi.

Design 
The car can accommodate two adults in the front and two children in the rear. The back seats can be folded down to provide cargo space.

The REVAi is intended for city trips and commuting, particularly in congested traffic. It is registered in Europe as a heavy quadricycle (category L7). It may be exported to the United States, with a speed limiter that limits the speed to twenty five miles per hour, for use as a neighborhood electric vehicle (NEV).

Models

First model 

The first model, produced from 2001 to 2007, was simply called REVA (G-Wiz in the United Kingdom).

REVAi 

In January 2008, a new model was introduced, the REVAi (G-Wiz i in the United Kingdom). The power flows through a 350 Amp motor controller to a 3-phase AC motor rated at  peak. Like the REVA, power comes from eight 6 V, 200 A h lead–acid batteries located under the front seats.

It weighs , including  batteries.

REVA L-ion 
In January 2009, a new model was launched, the REVA L-ion. The performance of these batteries is also less affected by variations in temperature.

An off-board charging station is available, which requires three phase power and gives a 90% charge in one hour. The REVA L-ion will also have a solar panel on the roof for harnessing solar energy.

Comparison of models

Sales and price 
The car was available in the following countries: Austria,  Belgium, Bhutan, Brazil, Canada, Chile, China, Colombia, Costa Rica, Croatia, Cyprus, The Czech Republic, Denmark, Egypt, France, Germany, Greece, Hungary, Iceland, India, Indonesia, Ireland, Italy, Japan, Jamaica, Malta, Monaco, Nigeria, Nepal, The Netherlands, Norfolk Islands, Norway, Peru, the Philippines, Poland, Portugal, Russia, Slovenia, Spain, Sri Lanka, Taiwan, Thailand, Sweden, Ukraine, The United Arab Emirates, The United States, and the United Kingdom.

The different versions of the REVA sold about 4,600 vehicles worldwide by late 2013, and India was its main market, accounting for 55% of global sales, of which, 40% were in the Bangalore city, where Mahindra Reva is based. The UK was one of the leading markets, and the REVA G-Wiz (as it was marketed in the country) was the top selling electric car in Britain for several years, particularly in London.

Pricing
The REVA was also sold in other European countries, including Spain and Norway.

REVA was sold for  350,000 in India and has a "running cost of just 40 paise/km" (40 paise [0.08 US cent]/km), considering the Indian petrol price of /liter.

Safety concerns 
The REVA is exempt from most European crash test rules, because its low weight and power registers it in the European "heavy quadricycle" category instead of the "car" category.

The UK Department for Transport found "serious safety concerns" after crashing a now-discontinued G-Wiz at  into a deformable barrier on 24 April 2007, which is part of the normal test for production cars. Likewise, a test commissioned by Top Gear Magazine that followed the Euro NCAP crash test specifications found that the occupants would suffer "serious or life-threatening" injuries in a 64 km/h (40 mph) crash.

In October 2010, a fatal accident in London occurred between a G-Wiz and a Škoda Octavia, with the driver of the G-Wiz, British scientist Judit Nadal, being killed. The coroner Andrew Walker was quoted as saying about the G-Wiz at the inquest: “What concerns me is that this vehicle was destroyed in this collision in a way that I have not seen a vehicle destroyed before” but he did not recommend further action regarding the vehicle's design. Mr Walker said he would be writing to Transport for London about making improvements to the safety of the junction. Subsequently, the government ordered an investigation into the safety of small electric vehicles.

Current REVAi and REVA L-ion models include several new safety features such as front disc brakes, a collapsible steering column, and a much revised and reinforced chassis that has been successfully crash tested in India by ARAI. A  frontal crash test video of the new model is available online.

Reception and criticism 
The REVAi has been panned by many critics, including criticisms that it is underpowered, unsafe, and ugly.  The BBC programme Top Gear has consistently and incessantly lambasted the G-Wiz, named it the Worst Car of 2007 and then even blew it up later in the same episode; co-presenter James May referred to it as "the worst car for this year - and indeed for every other year whilst we have breath in our bodies — it is the most stupid, useless and dangerous car ever to stalk the earth. It is totally terrible, and disgusting."

In July 2004, The Independent reported Archie Norman owned a G-Wiz to commute around London, and outside London, he drove a Volkswagen Golf.

In October 2013, Top Gear Magazine placed the G-Wiz on its list of "The 13 worst cars of the last 20 years."

In December 2016, twenty G-Wiz vehicles were destroyed in an episode of The Grand Tour and continuing on the theme of lambasting the car, which the presenters started whilst working together on Top Gear.

See also 
 City car
 Government incentives for plug-in electric vehicles
 Kei car
 List of modern production plug-in electric vehicles
 List of production battery electric vehicles
 Neighborhood electric vehicle
 Mahindra e2o
 Zero-emissions vehicle

References

External links 
REVA Electric Car Club

Production electric cars
Electric city cars
Cars of India
Car brands
Cars introduced in 2001